Amelia Walsh (born 2 August 1992) is a Canadian female cyclist. She started as a BMX rider at age 15.  She won several provincial championships before she began representing her nation at international competitions. She competed in the  UCI BMX World Championships in 2012, 2013, 2014 and 2015. Prior to that she competed in the 2009 World Junior Championships.  She was the Canadian BMX Women's Champion title holder in 2013, 2014 and 2015.

Career

Track cycling
Walsh switched to compete in track cycling after the 2016 BMX season and together with teammate Kate O'Brien captured a silver medal in the 2017 World Cup event in Los Angeles in team sprint.  She competed for Canada at the 2018 Commonwealth Games. Her goal is to be competitive for a medal at the 2020 Olympics in Tokyo, Japan .

References

External links
 
 

1992 births
Living people
BMX riders
Canadian track cyclists
Canadian female cyclists
Pan American Games silver medalists for Canada
Pan American Games medalists in cycling
Cyclists at the 2015 Pan American Games
Cyclists at the 2019 Pan American Games
Medalists at the 2019 Pan American Games
Commonwealth Games competitors for Canada
Cyclists at the 2018 Commonwealth Games
21st-century Canadian women